The Battle of Charleston or Siege of Charleston can refer to several battles:
 The Charles Town expedition (4 September - 11 September 1706) During the War of the Spanish Succession
 The Siege of Charleston (29 March - 12 May 1780) during the American Revolutionary War
 The Battle of Charleston (1861) (19 August 1861), a battle in Missouri during the American Civil War also known as the Battle of Bird's Point 
 The Battle of Charleston (1862) (13 September 1862), a battle in Virginia (now West Virginia) during the American Civil War 
 The First Battle of Charleston Harbor (7 April 1863) in South Carolina during the American Civil War
 The Second Battle of Charleston Harbor (18 July - 7 September 1863) in South Carolina during the American Civil War
 The Battle of Charleston (1865) in South Carolina during the American Civil War